Antonio Berney (died 1784) was a French teacher living in Chile, and one of the conspirators in the Conspiracy of the Tres Antonios.

Berney arrived in Chile around 1776, where he became teacher of Latin and Mathematics at the Convictorio Carolino, in Santiago. He was a constant reader of the Encyclopédie, and in 1780, he formulated a plan to establish Chile as an independent republic and convinced Antonio Gramusset and José Antonio de Rojas to join him in trying to carry it out. They were soon discovered, denounced and arrested on January 1, 1781. Because they were foreigners, he and Gramusset were sent as prisoners first to Lima and then to Spain to be tried. The ship that was carrying them, the San Pedro de Alcantara, went down in front of the coasts of Portugal during a storm, and he drowned.

18th-century births
1784 deaths
18th-century Chilean people
French emigrants to Chile